The Christmas Day (Trading) Act 2004 (c 26) is an Act of the Parliament of the United Kingdom. It prevents shops over 280 m2/3,000 sq ft from opening on Christmas Day in England and Wales. Shops smaller than the limit are not affected.

The Act was introduced to the House of Commons by Kevan Jones, MP for North Durham as a Private Member's Bill on 7 January 2004.

The aim of the Act was to keep Christmas Day a "special" day, whereby all major retailers would be closed. Although it was traditional for major retailers to close on 25 December, some retailers, such as Woolworths, began to open some stores in the late 1990s. Both religious groups and shop worker unions were against the idea of Christmas openings, leading to pressure on the Government to pass legislation to prevent the practice. The Sunday Trading Act 1994 had previously placed similar restrictions for Christmas Day trading when a Sunday, and for Easter Day.

In 2006, the Scottish Parliament debated a similar law that would apply to shops in Scotland. The law was enacted in 2007 and it contained special provisions for New Year's Day retail activities too.

References
Halsbury's Statutes,

External links

The Christmas Day (Trading) Act 2004, as amended from the National Archives.
The Christmas Day (Trading) Act 2004, as originally enacted from the National Archives.
Explanatory notes to the Christmas Day (Trading) Act 2004.
Department of Trade and Industry Factsheet

United Kingdom Acts of Parliament 2004
Christmas economics
Acts of the Parliament of the United Kingdom concerning England and Wales
Retailing in England
Retailing in Wales
Christmas in England
2004 in England
2004 in Wales
October 2004 events in the United Kingdom
2004 in economics